Mangelia perattenuata is a species of sea snail, a marine gastropod mollusk in the family Mangeliidae.

It was originally published by W.H. Dall as Magilia perattenuata [sic].

Description
The length of the shell attains 9.5 mm, its diameter 2.5 mm.

(Original description) The small, whitish shell is very slender..It contains one smooth turgid whorl in the protoconch, and six smooth normal subsequent whorls. The whorls are but slightly convex. The suture is very distinct, its posterior margin slightly overhanging or dominant. The aperture is narrow, short and simple. The outer lip is slightly concavely waved between the periphery and the suture. The siphonal canal is short, a little recurved and relatively rather wide.

Distribution
This marine species was found off Monterey Bay, California, USA.

References

External links
 Tucker, J.K. 2004 Catalog of recent and fossil turrids (Mollusca: Gastropoda). Zootaxa 682:1–1295.

perattenuata
Gastropods described in 1905